Elachista repanda is a moth of the family Elachistidae which is endemic to Australia.

References

Moths described in 2011
Endemic fauna of Australia
repanda
Moths of Australia